The 2017 New Zealand Derby was a horse race which took place at Ellerslie Racecourse on Saturday 4 March 2017. It was the 142nd running of the New Zealand Derby, and it was won by Gingernuts.

Sold for $5,000 as a weanling and $42,500 as a two-year-old, Gingernuts made a low-key start to his career with two wins in his first five starts – mostly in minor midweek company.

The son of Iffraaj was not even nominated for the Derby until 21 February. But everything changed in the Avondale Guineas, a Group Two race two weeks before the Derby. Gingernuts was a 26-to-one longshot in the $100,000 race and dropped back to a distant last after breaking slowly from the starting gate, but he produced a remarkable finishing burst to win by a length and a quarter.

The Guineas win earned Gingernuts second-favouritism in the Derby, in which he again produced a formidable finish down the home straight to beat the Australian-trained Rising Red by a length. The win sparked huge celebrations among an ownership syndicate of more than 30 people, most wearing matching orange 'G-Nuts' caps.

It was the first New Zealand Derby win for leading New Zealand syndicators Te Akau Racing, as well as for trainers Stephen Autridge and Jamie Richards. Autridge was the favourite to win the race as a jockey in 1981 aboard the undefeated Altitude, who suffered a catastrophic and fatal haemorrhage.

It was the second Derby win for champion jockey Opie Bosson, who won the race in 2015 aboard Mongolian Khan.

Race details
 Sponsor: Vodafone New Zealand
 Prize money: NZ$1,000,000
 Track: Good
 Number of runners: 18
 Winner's time: 2:28.27

Full result

Winner's details
Further details of the winner, Gingernuts:

 Foaled: 2 October 2013 at Goodwood Stud, Palmerston North
 Sire: Iffraaj; Dam: Double Elle (Generous)
 Owner: Te Akau Gingernuts Syndicate (Mgr: DC Ellis)
 Trainer: Stephen Autridge & Jamie Richards
 Breeder: Goodwood Stud
 Starts: 7
 Wins: 4
 Seconds: 1
 Thirds: 0
 Earnings: $671,250

The road to the Derby
Early-season appearances in 2016-17 prior to running in the Derby.

 Gingernuts – 1st Avondale Guineas
 Jon Snow – 2nd Hawke's Bay Guineas, 8th New Zealand 2000 Guineas, 3rd Great Northern Guineas, 3rd Levin Classic, 3rd Karaka 3YO Mile, 7th Herbie Dyke Stakes
 Beaumarchais – 9th Avondale Guineas
 Sacred Elixir – 1st Caulfield Guineas Prelude, 8th Caulfield Guineas, 1st Moonee Valley Vase, 2nd Victoria Derby, 4th Karaka 3YO Mile, 7th Avondale Guineas
 Charles Road – 2nd Avondale Guineas
 Camino Rocoso – 8th Avondale Guineas
 Excalibur – 5th Trevor Eagle Memorial, 6th Levin Classic, 6th Waikato Guineas
 Highlad – 1st Wanganui Guineas, 3rd UCI Stakes, 9th Caulfield Classic, 8th Victoria Derby, 7th Waikato Guineas, 5th Avondale Guineas
 Wyndspelle – 3rd Northland Breeders' Stakes, 5th Hawke's Bay Guineas, 3rd Sarten Memorial, 5th New Zealand 2000 Guineas, 5th Levin Classic, 1st Waikato Guineas
 Savile Row – 3rd Barneswood Farm Stakes, 2nd New Zealand 2000 Guineas, 2nd Levin Classic, 2nd Herbie Dyke Stakes
 Leading Role – 4th Zacinto Stakes, 9th Levin Classic, 10th Avondale Guineas
 Mongolian Wolf – 10th Northland Breeders' Stakes, 8th Bonecrusher Stakes, 3rd Avondale Guineas
 Stephenstihls – 2nd Zacinto Stakes, 7th Karaka 3YO Mile
 Lincoln Blue – 1st Wellington Stakes, 1st 3YO Salver, 4th Levin Classic, 3rd Waikato Guineas
 Redeem The Dream – 2nd 3YO Salver, 4th Avondale Guineas
 Cha Siu Bao – 4th New Zealand 2000 Guineas, 4th Great Northern Guineas, 4th Waikato Guineas, 6th Avondale Guineas

Subsequent Group 1 wins
Subsequent wins at Group 1 level by runners in the 2017 New Zealand Derby.

 Gingernuts - Rosehill Guineas, Windsor Park Plate
 Jon Snow - Australian Derby

See also

 2020 New Zealand Derby
 2019 New Zealand Derby
 2018 New Zealand Derby
 2016 New Zealand Derby
 2015 New Zealand Derby
 2014 New Zealand Derby
 2013 New Zealand Derby
 2012 New Zealand Derby
 2011 New Zealand Derby
 2010 New Zealand Derby
  Recent winners of major NZ 3 year old races
 Desert Gold Stakes
 Hawke's Bay Guineas
 Karaka Million
 Levin Classic
 New Zealand 1000 Guineas
 New Zealand 2000 Guineas
 New Zealand Oaks

References

New Zealand Derby
2017 in New Zealand sport
New Zealand Derby
March 2017 sports events in New Zealand